Chittaranjan Saha (1 January 1927 – 26 December 2007) was a Bangladeshi educationist. He was awarded Ekushey Padak in 2005 by the Government of Bangladesh.

Early life and education
Saha was born to Koilas Chandra Saha and Tirthabasi Saha in Latifur village, present-day Begumganj Upazila in Noakhali. He passed matriculation exam from Ramendra High School in 1943, and intermediate exam from Bangabasi College in 1946. Then he obtained BA degree from Chaumohani College in 1948.

Awards

 Ekushey Padak (2005)
 Vidyasagar Puraskar (2005)
 Natyasabha Puraskar (1988)

References

1927 births
2007 deaths
Bangladeshi educators
Recipients of the Ekushey Padak
People from Begumganj Upazila